Spliced may refer to:
Spliced, the result of rope splicing
Spliced (film), a 2002 horror film
Spliced (TV series), a cartoon series that started in 2009